The 2021–22 Temple Owls men's basketball team represented Temple University during the 2021–22 NCAA Division I men's basketball season. The Owls, led by third-year head coach Aaron McKie, played their home games at the Liacouras Center in Philadelphia, Pennsylvania as a member of the American Athletic Conference. They finished the season 17–12, 10–7 in AAC Play to finish in 4th place. They lost in the quarterfinals of the AAC tournament to Tulane.

Previous season
In a season limited due to the ongoing COVID-19 pandemic, the Owls finished the 2020–21 season 5–11, 4–10 in AAC play to finish in a tie for eighth place. They lost in the first round of the conference tournament to South Florida.

Offseason

Departures

Incoming transfers

2021 recruiting class

Roster

Schedule and results

|-
!colspan=12 style=| Regular season

|-
!colspan=12 style=| AAC Tournament

Source

References

Temple Owls men's basketball seasons
Temple
Temple
Temple